Fort San Pedro, also called Fuerza de la Nuestra Señora del Rosario, was a military defense structure in Iloilo City, Philippines. It was built in 1602 by Pedro Bravo de Acuña to protect the city from Moro and Dutch attacks, and was completely destroyed during World War II.

It was the second Spanish-built fort after the one in Cebu (also Fort San Pedro) in the Philippines and Asia.

History 

Fort San Pedro, formerly called Fortificación de Nuestra Señora del Rosario en el Puerto de Yloylo, Provincia de Oton, was first built out of wood in 1602 by Pedro Bravo de Acuña. It was renovated into a stone fort by Diego de Quiñones following the Dutch attack in 1616, where he found the image of Our Lady of the Most Holy Rosary, now enshrined at San Jose Church.

On October 10, 1903, US President Theodore Roosevelt declared it and its adjoining areas as a military reservation. In 1936, President Manuel Quezon designated the fort as a Philippine Army Post. When World War II erupted, the Japanese Imperial army seized control and made it into a headquarters. In March 1945, combined forces from the United States Navy and Air Force bombed all Japanese installations in Iloilo and pulverized Fort San Pedro.

Fort San Pedro, once a ruin, is now used as a park for recreation, outdoor dining, and drinking.

Since 2015, there have been several proposals to reconstruct Fort San Pedro.

See also 
 Fort San Pedro

References 

Buildings and structures in Iloilo City
Visayan history
History of the Philippines (1565–1898)
Spanish colonial infrastructure in the Philippines
Spanish Colonial Fortifications of the Philippines
Buildings and structures destroyed during World War II
San Pedro
Tourist attractions in Iloilo City